Marudhani is a 1985 Indian Tamil-language film, directed by Ramarajan and produced by P. Jayaraj. The film stars Pandiyan, Shobana, S. S. Chandran, Goundamani and Senthil. It was released on 1 September 1985.

Plot

Cast 
Pandiyan
Shobana as Marudhani
S. S. Chandran
Goundamani
Senthil as Dingu
Sulakshana
Janagaraj

Soundtrack 
The music was composed by Gangai Amaran.

References

External links 
 

1980s Tamil-language films
1985 films
Films directed by Ramarajan
Films scored by Gangai Amaran